Andingmen (lit. "Gate of Stability") was a gate in Beijing's Ming-era city wall.  The gate was torn down along with the city wall in the 1960s.  Andingmen is now a place name.  Where the gate once stood is now Andingmen Bridge, a roundabout overpass on the northern 2nd Ring Road.  The overpass links Andingmen Inner Street which runs south of the overpass inside the walled city and Andingmen Outer Street which runs north away from the wall of the city.  

Bus and trolleybus stops are nearby, along with Andingmen Station, Line 2 of the Beijing Subway.

Ju'er Hutong is a popular neighborhood for expats to live in.  It is located in the hutongs southwest of Jiaodaokou, and just east of Shichahai and Gulou (the Drum Tower). Yongkang Hutong is another popular residential location for expats in Beijing.

References

Dongcheng District, Beijing
Gates of Beijing
Neighbourhoods of Beijing
Road transport in Beijing
Demolished buildings and structures in China